A reaction step of a chemical reaction is defined as: "An elementary reaction, constituting one of the stages of a stepwise reaction in which a reaction intermediate (or, for the first step, the reactants) is converted into the next reaction intermediate (or, for the last step, the products) in the sequence of intermediates between reactants and products". To put it simply, it is an elementary reaction which goes from one reaction intermediate to another or to the final product.

Notes

Chemical kinetics